Cruachan are an Irish folk metal band from Dublin that have been active since the 1990s. They have been acclaimed as having "gone the greatest lengths of anyone in their attempts to expand" the genre of folk metal. They are recognised as one of the founders of the folk metal genre. With a specific focus on Celtic music and the use of Celtic mythology in their lyrics, Cruachan's style of folk metal is called Celtic metal. The band named themselves after the archaeological site of Rathcroghan in Ireland also known as Cruachan.

History
Keith Fay had formed a Tolkien-inspired black metal band named after the city of Minas Tirith in 1991. Around the same time, he began listening to more folk music and picked up Skyclad debut album The Wayward Sons of Mother Earth. Originally released in 1990, this "ambitious" and "groundbreaking" album made an impact on Fay and he set out to combine black metal with the folk music of Ireland. In 1992, Keith Fay formed Cruachan with a demo recording distributed in 1993. Keith Fay also credits the Irish rock band Horslips as a "huge influence on Cruachan," further noting that "what they were doing in the 70's is the equivalent of what we do now."

The year 1995 saw the release of Cruachan's debut album Tuatha na Gael, an album that "suffered under poor production." On the strength of this album, the band received attention from Century Media Records. The band found it amazing to receive interest from "such a big label" but were dismayed at the terms and conditions of the offered recording deal. They refused to sign a "very poor contract" that would have given the record label "the rights to change every aspect of our music." After "lengthy negotiations failed to yield a deal with Century Media Records", the band disbanded in 1997.

Cruachan reformed in January 1999 and after signing a recording deal with Hammerheart Records, they released the second album The Middle Kingdom in 2000. By this time, the band had dropped the black metal style in favor of a more traditional metal sound. They also expanded the roster by inviting guest vocalist Karen Gilligan to be a full-fledged member of the group. Their subsequent album Folk-Lore was co-produced by Shane MacGowan of The Pogues fame. Shane MacGowan also contributed vocals to two covers of traditional Irish songs, "Spancill Hill" and "Ride On." The latter was released as a single and the band experienced a small taste of commercial success when it entered the Irish charts.

The band released their fourth studio album Pagan in 2004 with cover artwork by John Howe. The production on the album was subsequently criticized by frontman Keith Fay as "terrible". In 2005, the band parted ways with their label Karmageddon Media "on good terms." For the band's fifth album, Cruachan returned to the same Sun Studios where they had recorded their first three albums. The result was The Morrigan's Call, an effort that Keith Fay described as their "best work to date, in every aspect." The album was released in November 2006 through AFM Records. Drummer Joe Farrell left the band shortly thereafter due to "personal reasons" and was replaced by Colin Purcell.

A further line-up change occurred in December 2008, as vocalist Karen Gilligan left the band "on good terms for various reasons." Keith Fay announced that he "will take over full-time vocal duties while John Ryan and John O' Fathaigh will take on backing vocal roles."

A demo was recorded in 2010 which showed the band's return to a much harder more black metal influenced style. This demo was sent to specific record labels only and Candlelight Records UK signed them in June 2010. Blood on the Black Robe, the first of the "Trilogy of Blood" albums, was released in 2011.

On the morning of 20 February 2011, Keith Fay was brutally assaulted by about 15 men after leaving a nightclub in Dublin. Fay survived the attack with a broken rib, a knife-wound, and extensive bruising.

2014 saw Cruachan leave Candlelight Records and sign with the dedicated folk and pagan metal record label, Trollzorn Records. This was also the busiest year of the band's career with very high-profile shows including a tour of Russia in March and headline shows in Germany, Ireland, Ukraine and Israel, as well as appearances at Ostrov festival (Russia), Bandershtat festival (Ukraine), HoernerFest (Germany), Brutal Assault (Czech Rep.), Rock for Roots (Germany), Halloween Fest (Italy) and Eindhoven Metal Meeting (The Netherlands). In between these shows they had been recording what would be their next studio album at the time. This album was titled "Blood for the Blood God" and was released on 5 December 2014. Due to their recording commitments they had to turn down a place on Paganfest USA 2014.

John Fay announced his departure from Cruachan on 24 June 2016. This marks his second departure from Cruachan, he left Cruachan after the FolkLore album and appeared on albums "Pagan" and "The Morrigan's Call" in a guest musician capacity.

On 27 April 2018 Cruachan released their 8th studio album titled Nine Years of Blood, a concept album about the Nine Years' War. It was the third and final album of the so-called "Blood Trilogy". This would be the last album to feature bassist Eric Fletcher who departed the band in September 2018. He was replaced by Rustam Shakirzianov.

The year of 2020 had seen the band experience some notable lineup changes. On 14 January, Cruachan announced that bassist Rustam had departed the band following their performance on 70000 Tons of Metal earlier that month. On 10 February 2020, Cruachan announced that former drummer Joe Farrell would be rejoining the band as Rustam's replacement on bass. On 8 July the band announced that drummer Mauro Frison was departing the band but not before he would contribute drums to the band's then upcoming single titled "The Hawthorn". It was announced later the same month on the 28 July that fiddle player John Ryan and Guitarist Kieran Ball would both be departing the band. During this period, Fay recruited Tom Woodlock on drums, Audrey Trainor on violin and Dave Quinn on guitar.

In early 2020, Cruachan left Trollzorn Records and signed a multi-album deal with Sweden's largest rock label – Despotz Records. As mentioned, 'The Hawthorn' single was released in 2020 and the ninth studio album The Living and the Dead is slated for a late 2022 release.

On October 1st, 2022, Cruachan announced that they had submitted a song for consideration for participation in the Eurovision Song Contest 2023 for the Republic of Ireland.

Discography

Studio albums
 Tuatha na Gael (1995)
 The Middle Kingdom (2000)
 Folk-Lore (2002)
 Pagan (2004)
 The Morrigan's Call (2006)
 Blood on the Black Robe (2011)
 Blood for the Blood God (2014)
 Nine Years of Blood (2018)

Singles
 "Ride On" (2001)
 "The Hawthorn" (2020)

Demos
 Celtica (Demo, 1994)
 Promo '97 (Demo, 1997, also included with 2001 bootleg of Tuatha na Gael)
 Untitled (Demo, 2010, led to new record deal with Candlelight records)

Compilations
 A Celtic Trilogy (2002 boxed set of Tuatha na Gael, The Middle Kingdom and Folk-Lore in picture LP format, limited to 500 copies)
 A Celtic Legacy (2007)

Line-up

Current members
 Keith Fay – vocals, guitars, keyboards, bodhrán, mandolin, percussion, bouzouki (1992–Present)
Joe Farrell - bass (2020–Present), drums (1999–2007)
Audrey Trainor - violin (2020–present) 
David Quinn - guitars (2020–present)
Tom Woodlock - drums (2020–present)

Past members
 John Clohessy – bass (1992–2012)
 John (O'Fathaigh) Fay – tin whistles, Irish flute, Keyboards, Percussion  (1993-1997, 1999-2002, 2003, 2008-2016)
 Jay O'Neill – drums, percussion (1993-1997)
 Steven Anderson - guitar, vocals (1993-1994)
 Darryl Conlan - guitar (1992-1993) 
 Leon Bias – guitars, mandolin, bouzouki (1994-1995)
 Collette Uí Fathaigh – keyboards (1994-1995)
 Jay Brennan - guitar (1997)
 Aisling Hanrahan - vocals (1997)
 Karen Gilligan – vocals, percussion (1999–2008)
 Edward Gilbert - Banjo, Guitar, Keyboards, Tin whistle (2001-2003)
 Colin Purcell – drums, percussion (2007-2012)
 Kieran Ball – guitar (2012–2020)
 Mauro Frison – drums, percussion (2012–2020)
 Eric Fletcher – bass (2012–2018)
 Rustam Shakirzianov – bass (2018–2020)
 John Ryan – violin, banjo, bouzouki (2004-2020), Tin whistle (2004-2008)

Timeline

See also 
Folk metal

References

External links
 Cruachan – Official Site – cruachanireland.com

Celtic fusion groups
Celtic metal musical groups
Irish folk metal musical groups
Irish black metal musical groups
Musical groups established in 1992
Musical groups disestablished in 1997
Musical groups reestablished in 1999
Musical groups from Dublin (city)
Musical quintets
Celtic mythology in music